Francesco Rucco (born 28 June 1974) is an Italian politician and lawyer.

He is member of the Independent politician party. He has served as Mayor of Vicenza since 2018. He was also elected president of the Province of Vicenza since 2018. He was first city councilor and then group leader of the National Alliance until his confluence with the People of Freedom. He elected to the city council for the first time in 2003. He carried out his professional practice in a law firm in Vicenza from 1999 to 2001. He was president of district 4 Postumia, the area of Vicenza between 2000 and 2003.

Biography
Francesco Rucco was born in Lecce, Italy on 1974. He is married to Ilaria and has two daughters. He studied in University of Parma.

References 

Living people
1974 births
Politicians of Veneto
People from Lecce
Independent politicians in Italy
21st-century Italian politicians
20th-century Italian politicians
20th-century Italian lawyers
Mayors of Vicenza
University of Parma alumni